St. Lucas Evangelical German Lutheran Church and Cemetery in rural Monroe County, Wisconsin is listed on the National Register of Historic Places.

References

Churches in Monroe County, Wisconsin
Churches on the National Register of Historic Places in Wisconsin
National Register of Historic Places in Monroe County, Wisconsin
Lutheran churches in Wisconsin